John Needham's Double is an 1885 novel and 1891 play by Joseph Hatton, and 1916 silent film.

Novel

The novel is subtitled "A Story Founded on Fact" and is based on the story of Irish financier and politician John Sadleir, who committed suicide.

The Saturday Review negatively reviewed the book, calling it "simply the story of John Sadleir .. with certain highly improbable, not to say impossible, additions and corrections of Mr. Hatton's own.  The story itself is neither interesting not instructive, nor yet amusing.... However, Mr. Hatton must not be taken too seriously.  Lovers of cheap sensation will not be hypercritical, and will probably find John Needham's Double exciting enough."  Punch's review called it a shilling dreadful but was slightly more positive: "there is no room for tall writing, or mere padding, when a real good story has to be told in two hundred small pages of print large enough to defy twilight and railway-carriage lamps."

Play

Augustus Thomas modified Hatton's play for A.M. Palmer's production in New York starring Edward Smith Willard, which debuted at Palmer's Theatre in February 1891 and played for just over a month.

The cast included Willard playing the dual roles of John Needham and Joseph Norbury, Marie Burroughs as Kate Norbury, Burr McIntosh as Col. Calhoun Booker, and Royce Carleton as Mr. Grant.

Cast
Joseph Norbury/John Needham ... Edward Smith Willard
Richard Woodville ... E.W. Gardiner
Mr. Horace West ... Charles Harbury
Mr. Grant ... Royce Carleton
Mr. Nolan ... Sant Matthews
Col. Calhoun Booker ... Burr McIntosh
Percy Tallant ... Bessie Hatton (daughter of Joseph Hatton)
Thomas ... Harry Cane
Sanders ... Lysander Thompson
Kate Norbury ... Marie Burroughs
Miss Dorothy Norbury ... Cecile Rush
Mrs. Needham ... Katherine Rogers
Miss Virginia Fleetwood ... Maxine Elliott
Hannah ... Cora Edsall

Silent film

A silent film version directed by Lois Weber premiered in April 1916, starring Tyrone Power, Agnes Emerson, and Frank Elliott.  The screenplay was by Olga Printzlau.

Cast
John Needham/Joseph Norbury ... Tyrone Power
Ellen Norbury ... Marie Walcamp
Parks ...Frank Elliott
Aunt Kate ... Agnes Emerson
Dobbins ... Walter Belasco
Cruet ... Frank Lanning
Thomas Creighton ... Buster Emmons
Maid ... Mary MacLaren (uncredited)

References

External links
 

1885 British novels
1891 plays
1916 films
Universal Pictures films
American silent feature films
American black-and-white films
1910s American films